In photography, a snoot is a tube or similar object that fits over a studio light or portable flash and allows the photographer to control the direction and radius of the light beam. These may be conical, cylindrical, or rectangular in shape. Snoots can isolate a subject when using a flash. They help by stopping "light spill", or when lighting falls in a larger footprint than intended.

Snoots can be different lengths and diameter, also made of various materials.

See also 
 Collimator
 Top hat

References

Photography equipment
Photographic lighting